The Mémorial de Caen is a museum and war memorial in Caen, Normandy, France commemorating  World War II  and the Battle for Caen. More generally, the museum is dedicated to the history of the twentieth century, mainly focused on the fragility of peace. Its intention is "pay a tribute to the martyred city of the liberation" but also to tell "what was the terrible story of the 20th century in a spirit of reconciliation".

Site 
The building and grounds are located in the northern suburbs of the city of Caen on the site of an old blockhouse. The architect was Jacques Millet and the original curator was Yves Degraine. On entrance of the building is written: "The pain broke me, the fraternity relieved me, of my wound sprang a river of freedom" (sentence by Paul Dorey, local poet who speaks in the name of Normandy). In front of the entrance, we can see the flags of the main nations involved in the Battle of Normandy, and "Non-violence", a sculpture by Swedish artist Carl Fredrik Reuterswärd.

The memorial is dedicated to the history of violence and intensive, outstanding conflicts in the 20th Century and particularly World War II. The museum was officially opened on June 6, 1988 (the 44th anniversary of D-Day) by the French President François Mitterrand. The original building deals primarily with World War II, looking at the causes and course of the conflict.

The museum was subsequently extended:

 In 1991 a gallery dedicated to the Nobel Peace Prize was added
 Three memorial gardens, The American Garden, The British Garden and the Canadian Garden were dedicated to the three main allied nations involved in liberating France
 An extension focusing on the Cold War and the search for Peace was opened by President Jacques Chirac in 2002. It comprises neutralized warheads, planes and a fragment of the Berlin Wall.

Gallery

References

 This article is a summary translation of the French Wikipedia Article

External links

Official website
 The Memorial de Caen at Google Cultural Institute

Buildings and structures in Caen
World War II museums in France
Peace museums
World War II memorials in France
Museums in Calvados (department)